Judith Allen Heard commonly known as Judith Heard (born 13 March 1986) is a Ugandan  fashion model and  event host. She was crowned as Miss Africa in Miss Elite Awards 2021 from  Egypt and Miss Environment International Africa 2022 in Mumbai, India.

Background and education
She was born in 1986 in Gulu, Uganda to the Late. John Musana and Olive Night Bitature .  Judith studied from Kampala Parents Primary School, Kigali Parents School, Fawe Girls Secondary School and later Ndera Secondary School in Kigali Rwanda.

Career
Judith Heard is a model by profession. Based on accounts by a publicist at Bryan Morel Publications, Judith moved to Uganda and started working with Sylivia Owori's modelling company  and became the face of African Woman Magazine in 2002. She has taken part in different runways such as New York fashion week, Paris Fashion Week, Rwanda Collective Fashion Week, Abryanz Fashion style and Fashion awards.  In September 2020, Judith Heard was invited to represent Uganda in Miss Elite Competitions 2020 in Egypt.

Personal life
Judith Heard married Richard Heard in 2003 and they divorced in 2014. She is a mother of 3; Brandon Richard Heard, Branda Jolie Heard and Briana Bella Heard.

Other considerations
In February 2019, Judith launched Day One Global an advocacy  organisation  that seeks to curb Sexual harassment and rape among women. She has worked with Sanyu babies home in Kampala.

Nominations & Awards

References

Living people
1986 births
Ugandan models
Ugandan women